Banarhat railway station  is the railway station which serves the town of Banarhat in the Indian state of West Bengal. It lies in the New Jalpaiguri–Alipurduar–Samuktala Road line of Northeast Frontier Railway zone, Alipurduar railway division.

Trains
Major trains running from Banarhat Railway Station are as follows:

Sealdah-Alipurduar Kanchan Kanya Express
Siliguri Bamanhat Intercity Express.
Siliguri–Alipurduar Intercity Express
Siliguri–Dhubri Intercity Express

References

Railway stations in West Bengal
Alipurduar railway division